Antigonides is a former municipality in Imathia, Greece. Since the 2011 local government reform it is part of the municipality Alexandreia, of which it is a municipal unit. The municipal unit has an area of 57.874 km2. Population 4,435 (2011). The seat of the municipality was in Kavasila.

References

Populated places in Imathia